German submarine U-325 was a Type VIIC/41 U-boat of Nazi Germany's Kriegsmarine during World War II.

The submarine was laid down on 13 April 1943 at the Flender Werke at Lübeck, launched on 25 March 1944, and commissioned on 6 May 1944 under the command of Oberleutnant zur See Erwin Dohrn.

Design
German Type VIIC/41 submarines were preceded by the heavier Type VIIC submarines. U-325 had a displacement of  when at the surface and  while submerged. She had two shafts and two  propellers.

U-325 was fitted with five  torpedo tubes (four fitted at the bow and one at the stern), fourteen torpedoes, one  SK C/35 naval gun, (220 rounds), one  Flak M42 and two  C/30 anti-aircraft guns. The boat had a complement of between forty-four and sixty.

Service history

U-325s first patrol took her from Kiel in Germany to Horten Naval Base in Norway, between 1 and 4 December 1944. She then sailed from Horten on 9 December 1944, and around the British Isles into the western English Channel, before returning to Trondheim on 14 February 1945, although she recorded no successes.

Loss
U-325 sailed from Trondheim on 20 March 1945 for her third and final patrol and was ordered to return to the waters off Lands End. Even though her last report was received on 7 April, when Germany surrendered on 8 May 1945 U-325 was still considered operational by the U-boat High Command. However it soon became apparent that the submarine was lost.

Discovery
The wreck of U-325 was finally discovered by Scuba divers in 2006,  South of Lizard Point at position . To counter the increasing number of schnorkel-fitted U-boats in UK coastal waters, the First Sea Lord ordered a heavy anti-U-boat mining programme to be undertaken in the Western Approaches, Plymouth and Portsmouth Commands on 15 January 1945. By April 1945, nine different fields (Serial B1, part 1 to 4, Serial B2, part 1 to 4, and Serial B3, part 1), comprising 900 Mk XVII/XVII(8) mines were laid off Lizard Head. U-325 struck a mine in field B3, part 1.

See also
 Battle of the Atlantic (1939-1945)

References

Bibliography

External links

German Type VIIC/41 submarines
U-boats commissioned in 1944
World War II submarines of Germany
U-boats sunk in 1945
U-boats sunk by mines
1944 ships
Ships built in Lübeck
Ships lost with all hands
Maritime incidents in April 1945